Thủ Thiêm is a ward of Thủ Đức City in Ho Chi Minh City, Vietnam.

References

Populated places in Ho Chi Minh City